Michel Barsoum born January 1, 1955, Cairo, Egypt) is an  American material scientist and engineer, currently a distinguished professor at Drexel University, Philadelphia, Pennsylvania, in the field of materials science and engineering and also a published author. In 2009, he became the holder of the A. W. Grosvenor Professorship at Drexel.

Education 
Barsoum was educated at The American University in Cairo, Egypt and graduated with a Bachelor of Science degree in ceramics engineering in 1977. He continued his education at University of Missouri, Rolla and graduated with a Master of Science in June 1980. He also has a Ph.D. from the Massachusetts Institute of Technology, his ceramics degree earned in June 1985 from their Department of Materials Science and Engineering.

Biography 
Barsoum is distinguished professor in the Department of Materials Science and Engineering at Drexel University in Philadelphia, Pennsylvania. He is a member of the American Ceramics Society and the World Academy of Ceramics.

Barsoum is a recognized leader in the area of MAX phases, which were first fabricated and fully characterized with Dr. Tamer El Raghy at Drexel University in 1995. They synthesized two families of ternary machinable carbides and nitrides, namely Ti³SiC² and the H-phases. Barsoum and his collaborators have published over 200 papers on MAX phases. He is the author of the two entries on the MAX phases in the Encyclopedia of Materials Science and Engineering.

Professor Barsoum was awarded a Humboldt Max Planck Research Award in 2000 and worked one year at the Max Planck Institute in Stuttgart, Germany. In 2008–2009, he was a Wheatley Scholar at Los Alamos National Lab in Los Alamos, New Mexico. He is a visiting professor at Linkoping University in Linkoping, Sweden.

He is an inventor of 2D transitional metal carbides, carbonitrides and nitrides labeled MXenes and derived from the MAX phases. They can be used in many applications, most significantly in lithium-ion and sodium-ion energy storage systems. The polycrystalline nanolaminate structure of these compounds endowed them with a set of unique and remarkable properties that have application in electromagnetic interference (EMI) shielding and water purification.

Most recently Barsoum discovered a new universal mechanism – ripplocation - in the deformation of layered solids.
 	
With over 450 refereed publications and a Google h index > 100, his work has been highly and widely cited—57,684 times (Google Scholar). He has been on the Web of Science's highly cited researchers list in 2018 and 2019. Barsoum is a foreign member of the Royal Swedish Society of Engineering Sciences, fellow of the American Ceramic Soc. and the World Academy of Ceramics. He is the author of the books, MAX Phases: Properties of Machinable Carbides and Nitrides, 2013, and Fundamentals of Ceramics, 2020, a textbook in second edition. 
Barsoum was a recipient of a Chair of Excellence from the Nanosciences Foundation in Grenoble, France in 2017. In 2020, he was awarded the International Ceramics Prize for basic science by the World Academy of Ceramics, to be presented in Montecatini Terme, Italy 2021. This prize is awarded quadrennially and is one of the highest in his field. The prize was awarded for “…  outstanding contribution in opening new horizons in material research and specifically for pioneering work in MAX phases and their derivatives.”

References

Living people
American materials scientists
21st-century American engineers
American science writers
Drexel University faculty
MIT School of Engineering alumni
Missouri University of Science and Technology alumni
The American University in Cairo alumni
Academic staff of Linköping University
Los Alamos National Laboratory personnel
Academic staff of Max Planck Society
Year of birth missing (living people)